Barchov is a municipality and village in Hradec Králové District in the Hradec Králové Region of the Czech Republic. It has about 300 inhabitants.

Notable people
Vilma Jamnická (1906–2008), Slovak actress

References

External links

Villages in Hradec Králové District